The Church of St. Similien, Nantes is an ancient church, in the Hauts-Pavés district of Nantes, France.

It is dedicated to Similien of Nantes and is located on the northwest side of the Place Saint-Similien.

Gallery

History
After the death of Bishop Similien 17 June 310, his successor, Eumilius, erected over his grave a votive chapel.

One hundred years later, the bishop Leo, a Greek (444-458) built a real church 20 meters long and 9 meters wide which is also called "Holy Sambin". It ends east exedra by a narrow apse of 4 meters in diameter. The building, which then dominates the "Bourgneuf", built in square stones interspersed with brick chaining, will be dedicated on 24 June 419, day of the Nativity of St. John the Baptist. It also has the oldest baptismal fonts of Nantes (fifth century).
In 848, Nantes is vandalized during the Norman invasions. If the church is not destroyed, it is nevertheless looted, and the saint's relics deposited at the well (which still exists) disappear at that time. In 958, a procession allows to Gauthier bishop and his canons, to launch a public subscription to undertake the restoration of the building, which will be completed towards 1172, by the Duke Geoffroy II.

Following the siege of Nantes by Louis XI in 1487, Bishop Peter of Chaffault, repaired and enlarged the basilica
Building it in the form of a Latin cross. The apse is Merovingian but the nave was extended towards the west, and flanked by two crosses. The bell tower to the west, raised 1.20 meters above street level measured 32.43 m high and consisted of: a square tower with a height of 17.30 m and an area of 30 m2, supported by buttresses and decorated with narrow basket-handle windows to illuminate the staircase; a wooden belfry in the form of 3,50 m high needle; a pavilion with a height of 6.05 m; a slate arrow of 3.48 meters high topped by a ball and a cross with a height of 2 meters [1].

During the French revolution, the church was closed to worship in 1793 and reopened after the Concordat of 1802. In 1824, the Millennium old building was destroyed and a church with three naves replaced it. The façade and portico were completed in 1835.

Fifteen years later, in 1850, the parish priest and the Church Council were considering the construction of a new church. In 1869, an architect, Eugene Boismen was appointed. The plans he offers were a Gothic building, inspired by those of the first half of the thirteenth century. The north-west facing building will include three naves, two ambulatory, bedside with a chapel which will be placed Our Lady of Mercy. The nave of five bays and end with a facade with two arrows. Permission to build the new church in 1872 is given. The Bishop Félix Fournier blessed the first stone of the new sanctuary on 5 October 1873. The work was completed in 1894 but as early as 1880, the vaults of the apse, the choir and transept were completed.

BOUGOUIN François, who took over from Boismen in 1891. The sanctuary is accessed by a wide staircase of eight steps overlooking Piazza San Similien.

In 1902, a new priest begins façade work that will never be completed. While the church tower was not completed, the twin bells of the old sanctuary, fell down from their tower on 8 July 1894, however since 1820 awaiting a new assignment (the fondue and blessed in 1819 under the invocation of St. Anne, weighs 1 200 kg. The other, Similien weighs 800 kg).

References

Roman Catholic churches in Nantes